Mount Independence is the second highest peak in the Albion Mountains of Idaho. The peak is located in Sawtooth National Forest and Cassia County. The Independence Lakes are located in the basin to the east of the peak. Mount Independence supports one of the three populations of Cymopterus davisii, a plant that is endemic to the Albion Mountains. The Mount Independence population is considered a single population with Cache Peak.

See also

List of mountain peaks of Idaho
List of mountain peaks of the United States
List of mountain peaks of North America
List of mountains of Idaho
List of mountain ranges in Idaho

References 

Independence
Mountains of Cassia County, Idaho
Sawtooth National Forest